Plunder is a tabletop role-playing game supplement for RuneQuest. Originally published by Chaosium in 1980, it was republished in 2016 in PDF format as part of Chaosium's RuneQuest: Classic Edition Kickstarter.

Contents
Plunder is a supplement for RuneQuest, half of which consists of a shorthand method for generating treasure, while the other half describes 43 exotic magic items.

Reception
Forrest Johnson reviewed Plunder in The Space Gamer No. 33. Johnson commented that "the lack of exotic magic items has heretofore been a weak point in RuneQuest. The items have authentic Gloranthan flavor, complete with history and cult affinities.  The discreet use of these items will add spice to a campaign without reducing it to Monty Haul."

Oliver Macdonald reviewed Plunder for White Dwarf #25, giving it an overall rating of 5 out of 10, and stated that "All points considered Plunder is an interesting but by no means essential RuneQuest play aid, certainly not worth buying if you have a limited budget."

John T. Sapienza, Jr. reviewed Plunder for Different Worlds magazine and stated that "Plunder is a useful idea, and well done. I recommend it to all RQ GMs."

Reviews
 The Dungeoneers Journal (Issue 25 - Feb/Mar 1981)

References

External links
 

Role-playing game supplements introduced in 1980
RuneQuest 2nd edition supplements